Kenny McFadden (18 August 1960 – 24 March 2022) was an American basketball player and coach. Born in the United States, he moved to New Zealand in 1982 to play for the Wellington Saints, where he played 15 seasons and won four NBL championships. He was instrumental in developing and coaching New Zealand's young basketball players over 40 years.

Early life and college
McFadden grew up in East Lansing, Michigan, and attended J. W. Sexton High School. He played two seasons of college basketball for Washington State University between 1980 and 1982.

Professional career
McFadden moved to New Zealand in 1982 to play for the Wellington Saints. In his first year, he guided the team to the second division title, before going onto six straight NBL Grand Finals. He led the Saints to championships in 1984, 1985, 1987 and 1988. He finished his playing career as a four-time All-Star Five member, a two-time outstanding guard, a two-time scoring champion, and a three-time assist champion. He played 252 NBL games in total, scoring 5004 points for a career average over 20 points per game. In 2021, he was named the number 2 greatest NBL player of all time. His No. 5 jersey was retired by the Saints in 2010.

Coaching career
Following his retirement in 1996, McFadden became heavily involved with junior player development, founding his own hoops academy in Wellington as well as coaching the Junior Tall Blacks to the under-19 world championships in 2009. He was well known as the mentor and manager of New Zealand NBA player Steven Adams.

In 2010 and 2011, McFadden served as an assistant coach for the Wellington Saints under coach Pero Cameron. He returned to the role in 2019 under coach Paul Henare and again in 2021 under Zico Coronel. The Saints won championships all four years with McFadden as assistant.

Personal life
McFadden's father and three uncles played gridiron professionally. In the 1980s, McFadden's brother was a DJ in New York.

McFadden was childhood friends with NBA legend Magic Johnson.

Medical condition and death
In 2017, McFadden was rushed to hospital with acute respiratory failure and was subsequently diagnosed with polycystic kidney disease, a genetic disorder. For more than a year, he had to go to hospital three times a week to be hooked up to a dialysis machine for four and a half hours at a time. He had a kidney donated to him in 2018.

McFadden died in March 2022 in Wellington at age 61 from polycystic kidney disease.

References

1960 births
2022 deaths
American expatriate basketball people in New Zealand
American men's basketball players
Basketball coaches
Deaths from kidney disease
New Zealand men's basketball players
Washington State Cougars men's basketball players
Wellington Saints players